Gilbert Diendéré (born  1960) is a Burkinabé military officer and the Chairman of the National Council for Democracy, the military junta that briefly seized power in Burkina Faso in the September 2015 coup d'état. He was a long-time aide to President Blaise Compaoré, serving as commander of the Regiment of Presidential Security (RSP) during Compaoré's rule. He was appointed as chairman of the junta on 17 September 2015.

Career 
Diendéré is suspected of having been directly involved in the October 1987 coup that resulted in the death of Thomas Sankara and installed Blaise Compaoré in power. Diendéré was commander of the national commando training center in Pô at the time of the coup, and all known assailants were identified by the sole survivor of the assault, Alouna Traoré, as having served directly under Diendéré.

During Compaoré's 27 years in power, Diendéré was considered one of his key allies in the military and served as chief of staff and head of the elite Regiment of Presidential Security (RSP) although he was also viewed as a shadowy figure. In late 2014, after the ouster of Compaoré, Diendéré was dismissed from his military leadership posts by the transitional authorities. Although he no longer headed the RSP, he remained closely linked to it during the events of 2015 in which the RSP found itself at odds with the transitional authorities, which wanted to disband it.

Members of the RSP launched a coup on 16 September 2015 and detained President Michel Kafando and Prime Minister Isaac Zida. On 17 September, Diendéré was appointed as Chairman of the National Council for Democracy, the new military junta. However, the junta failed to consolidate its authority across the country and faced pressure from regional leaders and eventually the regular army. At least 270 people were wounded and 17 killed as a result of the coup.

On 22 September 2015, the RSP agreed to a deal with the regular military requiring all RSP troops to return to their base. On 23 September, Interim President Kafando was restored to office. Diendéré admitted that the coup had been a "waste of time and resources... and human lives were lost". A meeting between Diendéré and several West African leaders occurred after a ceremony celebrating Kafando's return.

The government dissolved the RSP on 25 September 2015 and on 26 September froze the assets of Diendéré and others associated with the coup. After the army assaulted and captured the RSP's base, Diendéré fled to the Vatican embassy. The government assured the Vatican that Diendéré would not be killed, and he was turned over and taken into custody by the government on 1 October, escorted by former President Jean-Baptiste Ouédraogo. He was sentenced to 20 years in prison.

In addition to facing prosecution for the coup, Diendéré was also charged with involvement in Sankara's death, along with Compaoré and 12 other people. In November 2021, he appeared in court to testify in which he denied taking part in the arrests in question. Closing arguments were expected to take place the last week of January 2022, but after the coup on 23 January, the trial was suspended and Diendéré was freed from prison, with supporters of junta claiming that the prosecution had been politically motivated.

Personal life
Diendéré is married to Fatou Diallo Diendéré, a politician who was sentenced to 30 years in prison for murder, assault, battery and harming state security.

References 

1960 births
Burkinabé military personnel
Leaders who took power by coup
Living people
Heads of state of Burkina Faso
21st-century Burkinabé people